Spyke (Evan Daniels) is a fictional character created by writer Robert N. Skir and artist Steven E. Gordon for the WB animated superhero series X-Men: Evolution, which is based on American comic books published by Marvel Comics. Voiced by Neil Denis, the character is a high school student with the mutant ability to project spikes out of his body. Originally, Spyke was intended to be called Armadillo and have cornrows. He was created as a way to diversify the series' X-Men roster and include an African American among the main characters, something important to the creators, the network and Marvel Comics. According to producer Boyd Kirkland, turning Bishop (the first Black male X-Man) into a teenager would not have worked. Spyke has similar powers to Marrow, a pre-existing character, though Kirkland says this was not intentional.

Character biography
Evan Daniels was born in New York City, New York to an unnamed father and Vivian Daniels. His mutant abilities are first noticed at his high school basketball game by his Aunt Ororo (aka Storm, a longtime member of the X-Men), and his teammate Pietro. The following night, Storm, along with Cyclops and Jean Grey, approach Evan's parents about his mutant powers and his attending Xavier's School. Evan angrily declines on his own behalf and leaves.

He goes to his school to catch the thief who keeps breaking into his locker. It is revealed that Pietro is not only the thief, but a mutant with super speed powers. Pietro, who renames himself Quicksilver, breaks into all the lockers in the school and lets Evan take the heat while he escapes prosecution. Only when Charles Xavier uses his pull to help Evan get out of prison does he join the X-Men and the school under the code name Spyke. Spyke settles the score with Quicksilver when he, Cyclops, and Jean defeat the speedy mutant. Spyke is cleared of all charges when he catches Quicksilver's arrogant confession on tape.

During his tenure with the X-Men, Spyke didn't want any special treatment from anyone at the school because he was Storm's nephew. Though he liked being an X-Man and thought of them as his family, Spyke at times acted selfishly and inconsiderate of others. Spyke would goof around in class and on at least one occasion ditched school mid-class to go skateboarding with his human friends. He also was late for several training exercises in the Danger Room resulting in him getting reprimanded by Storm and causing several X-Kids to fail in their training exercise because Spyke was not there to back them up. If not for him saving Storm's life from the Hungan, Spyke would have been sent home to his parents due to his lack of concern for school and DR training.

After he and the other X-Men were discovered to be mutants, Spyke grew angry at how they were being treated. After drinking Pow-R8, an energy drink that was toxic to mutants who even come into contact with it, Spyke found out he could not retract or fully control his spikes. After seeing how cruelly he was treated because of his condition, Spyke joined the Morlocks (a group of mutants who could not "pass" for human and so were driven underground) because he wanted to fight for mutants who looked different from normal humans. Storm did not take this well and tried to convince Spyke to come back, but he refused.

When Evan returned later in the series, he had mutated even further, and now most of his upper body was covered by armadillo-type bone-plates except for his face and below the waist, and with the new ability to heat up the bone spikes he creates. During this time, Spyke began using his powers to fight against humans who were attempting to commit hate crimes against the Morlocks and mutants in general. These actions eventually led to him being the target of a group of anti-mutant bigots, led by Duncan Matthews. Attacked with electrical mining guns, Spyke was cornered, but the Morlocks and X-Men stepped in and defeated Duncan and his accomplices, who were arrested by the police shortly after the battle was over. When Storm tried to persuade him once again to return to the institute, Spyke said the Morlocks needed him more and chose to remain with them.

He later helped out in destroying the Pyramids surfaced by Apocalypse. Spyke is last seen in a group photo with the future X-Men, the New Mutants and their unaffiliated allies. In this photo, he is wearing the bottom half of his X-Men costume, which may mean he has finally returned to the X-Men.

Powers and abilities
Spyke can extend or retract bone spikes that grow inside his body. He may shoot them out or bring them out to grab and hold. He also needs to drink milk to replace the calcium that he loses when using his powers. His body also seals the wounds caused by projecting his spikes with no visible scarring.  He is also an expert skateboarder, and has integrated his skateboarding prowess into battles. 

In the later episodes as his mutation evolved, Spyke gained the ability to heat up the ends of the spikes, increasing their damage potential, and his strength is almost twice that of an average human. He now also has protective plates form around his body, but is unable to retract them. He also gained the ability to extend small spikes on his feet to scale and stick to walls.

Other versions
Earth-616 featured a character loosely based on Evan Daniels. David Munroe was born in New Jersey to an unknown father and Vivian Munroe (Storm's aunt). Vivian named her son David after Ororo's father, who had died too soon. Unfortunately, she later became a drug addict and eventually died of HIV, leaving young David in the care of his loving grandparents. David later met his cousin Storm when she was researching her family tree. David Munroe Jr. and his family later attended the wedding of Storm and Black Panther in Wakanda.

In other media
A version of Spyke appeared in the X-Babies Stars Reborn as an evil, indestructible X-Baby.

See also
 List of X-Men: Evolution characters
 List of Marvel Comics characters

References

External links
 Spyke's Profile at Marvel Animation Age

Comics characters introduced in 2000
Black characters in animation
Fictional vigilantes
African-American superheroes
Marvel Comics mutants
Fictional blade and dart throwers
Fictional characters with fire or heat abilities
Marvel Comics characters with superhuman strength
Fictional skateboarders
Fictional basketball players
Fictional characters from New York (state)
Male characters in animation
X-Men: Evolution characters
Marvel Comics male superheroes
X-Men members